Stobierna may refer to the following places:
Stobierna, Dębica County in Subcarpathian Voivodeship (south-east Poland)
Stobierna, Rzeszów County in Subcarpathian Voivodeship (south-east Poland)